Purmandal (also called Chhota Kashi) is a village located on the Devika River in Samba district, Jammu and Kashmir, India. The village and its temples are a pilgrimage site for Hindus, who believe bathing in the river cleanses the soul.

Geography

Around
Devika runs down from Purmandal to Uttarvehni through village Mandal. Uttarvehni in local language (i.e., Dogri) means flowing towards north. It is one of the rare places where a river flows from south to north. Rameshwaram and Bhuteshawar are ancient temples in Mandal.

Points of interest
Purmandal Temple, dedicated to Parvati, is built on the west bank of the river. A number of other temples are dedicated to Shiva. There is a large haveli (mansion) dating from about 1830, in good condition, and several dharamshalas (rest-houses for pilgrims), mostly severely deteriorated. Many of these structures are decorated with murals dating from between 1813 and 1898.

Transport
Buses connect the village to Jammu.

Events

Every month a Mela is organized here. The devotees take a holy dip in the Devak river and seek blessings. There are total 12 Mela in a year. Every Mela has assigned a unique name corresponding to the month, i.e. Chaitra Chaudish, Shivraatri Mela, etc.

References

Hindu temples in Jammu and Kashmir
Shiva temples in India
Religious tourism in India
Hindu pilgrimage sites in India
Tourist attractions in Jammu and Kashmir
Archaeological sites in Jammu and Kashmir
Villages in Samba district